InfoCision Management Corporation is a company that operates call centers. Based in Bath Township, Ohio outside of Akron, it is the second-largest teleservice company in the United States. It operates 30 call centers at 12 locations in Ohio, West Virginia, and Pennsylvania, employing more than 4,000 people. The company "specializes in political, Christian and nonprofit fundraising, and sales and customer care."

History 
InfoCision was founded by Gary Taylor in his suburban Akron home in 1982.  For the first three years, IMC managed its client's telefundraising campaigns by serving as a marketing consultant while a separate call center company made the phone calls.  In 1985, InfoCision opened its first call center.  Since then, InfoCision has become one of the largest privately held call center companies in the world.  Today, InfoCision raises more money for nonprofit organizations than any other outbound teleservices company.  In 2004, Taylor stepped down as president and CEO to become chairman.

On April 20, 2012, Ohio Attorney General Mike DeWine announced a settlement agreement he had reached with InfoCision. After an investigation, the Attorney General's Charitable Law Section "found reason to believe InfoCision violated several sections of the Ohio Charitable Organizations Act."  InfoCision denied violating the law.  As part of the settlement, InfoCision agreed to pay $75,000 and "fully abide by the state's laws on soliciting charitable contributions."

On October 10, 2012, the company announced that Craig Taylor, son of company founder Gary Taylor, was promoted to the position of CEO, replacing Carl Albright.

Gary Taylor died March 2, 2013, just over three years after he fell ill from a heart attack suffered in 2009. He was 59.

Products and services 

InfoCision's services are used by a wide variety of clients.  These include national nonprofit organizations, Fortune 100 companies and smaller businesses, focusing on customer acquisition, customer care and retention, and nonprofit fundraising, as well as volunteer recruitment.  The company is divided into nine divisions, which are financial services, telecommunications, media, consumer and business services and religious, nonprofit and political fundraising.

In addition to call centers, InfoCision also provides direct mail/bulk fulfillment services, offering variable on-demand data printing services, a one-to-one marketing strategy.  On-demand printing allows different elements such as text, graphics and images to change from one printed piece to the next without stopping or slowing down the printing process to deliver a customized message to customers.

Controversy 
InfoCision telefundraisers often request that people volunteer to mail fifteen preprinted solicitation letters to their friends and family. The volunteers are asked to use their own postage, and the funds are sent to InfoCision, earmarked for reputable charities such as the March of Dimes and the American Cancer Society.

Bloomberg alleged that InfoCision sometimes takes as much as 100% of the proceeds raised for nonprofits and that givers are often unaware of the percentage of their money that goes to the telemarketing firm. All information regarding percentages of donations used for fundraising is made available upon request. InfoCision responded with its own four-point statement: (1) the company must be on the right track if charities continue returning to them; (2) acquiring new donors and reengaging lapsed donors can be costly; (3) charities' future fundraising efforts will benefit from donors that the company brought into the system; and (4) the system was comparable to marketing techniques such as loss leaders that are common in the commercial world.

Philanthropy 
In 2008, InfoCision and its employees donated more than $450,000 to various causes, and in 2009, despite the economic downturn, donated more than $250,000, in addition to volunteering.

In 2004, InfoCision Founder Gary Taylor donated more than $3.5 million to fund the development of Taylor Institute for Direct Marketing at the University of Akron.

National Rifle Association 
The National Rifle Association paid InfoCision more than $80,000,000 for solicitation of donations and membership processing services for the period 2012 through 2015, according to the NRA's publicly available IRS Form 990 filings.

References

External links 
 Official InfoCision Management Corporation website
 InfoCision Stadium website
 The Taylor Institute for Direct Marketing

Call centre companies
Telemarketing